Breznakia is a genus from the family of Erysipelotrichidae.

See also
 List of bacterial orders
 List of bacteria genera

References 

Erysipelotrichia
Bacteria genera
Taxa described in 2016